The 372nd Engineer Brigade is a combat engineer brigade of the United States Army based in Fort Snelling, Minnesota. Recently converted from the 372nd Engineer Group which traces its lineage back to World War II, the brigade was activated on 16 September 2008. It is a United States Army Reserve formation and is subordinate to the 416th Theater Engineer Command out of Darien, Illinois.

Organization 
The brigade is a subordinate unit of the 416th Theater Engineer Command (Darien, Illinois). The brigade contains three subordinate battalions:
 367th Engineer Battalion, in St. Cloud, Minnesota
 863rd Engineer Battalion, in Darien, Illinois
 983rd Engineer Battalion, in Monclova, Ohio.

Lineage 
Constituted 5 September 1928 in the Organized Reserves as Headquarters and Headquarters and Service Company, 337th Engineer Regiment

Organized by July 1931 at Huntington, West Virginia

Ordered into active military service 20 July 1942 at Camp Swift, Texas

Redesignated 1 August 1942 as Headquarters and Headquarters and Service Company, 337th Engineer General Service Regiment

Disbanded 16 September 1944 in Italy

Reconstituted 19 November 1946 in the Organized Reserves as Headquarters and Headquarters and Service Company, 337th Engineer General Service Regiment

Activated 2 December 1946 at Baltimore, Maryland

(Organized Reserves redesignated 25 March 1948 as the Organized Reserve Corps; redesignated 9 July 1952 as the Army Reserve)

Inactivated 9 February 1949 at Baltimore, Maryland

Redesignated 8 June 1949 as Headquarters and Headquarters Company, 372d Engineer Construction Group

Activated 25 July 1949 at Des Moines, Iowa

Reorganized and redesignated 1 February 1954 as Headquarters and Headquarters Company, 372d Engineer Group

Inactivated 28 May 1959 at Des Moines, Iowa

Activated 15 March 1963 at Des Moines, Iowa

Ordered into active military service 7 December 2003 at Des Moines, Iowa; released from active military service 3 June 2005 and reverted to reserve status

Location changed 17 April 2007 to Fort Snelling, Minnesota

Reorganized and redesignated 16 September 2008 as Headquarters and Headquarters Company, 372d Engineer Brigade

Honors

Campaign streamers

Unit Decorations
Meritorious Unit Citation, Citation awarded to the 372nd Engineer Brigade for actions in Afghanistan from November 2009 to September 2010.

References

External links
372nd Engineer Brigade Homepage
The Institute of Heraldry: 372nd Engineer Brigade
Article from Afghanistan
Schroeder assumes Command of 372 Engineer Brigade

Engineer 372
Military units and formations of the United States Army Reserve
Military units and formations established in 1928